The Yvette is a small river in southern Île-de-France (France), left tributary of the Orge, which is a tributary of the Seine. Its source is in Les Essarts-le-Roi, north of Rambouillet, in the Yvelines department. Various communes of the Essonne département are named after it: Bures-sur-Yvette, Gif-sur-Yvette and Villebon-sur-Yvette.

The Yvette crosses the following départements and towns:

Yvelines: Lévis-Saint-Nom, Dampierre-en-Yvelines, Saint-Forget, Chevreuse, Saint-Rémy-lès-Chevreuse
Essonne: Gif-sur-Yvette, Bures-sur-Yvette, Orsay, Villebon-sur-Yvette, Palaiseau, Champlan, Saulx-les-Chartreux, Longjumeau, Chilly-Mazarin, Épinay-sur-Orge, Savigny-sur-Orge

Tributaries
Left bank:

Ru du Pommeret
Ruisseau de la Goutte d'Or
Rhodon
Mérantaise

Right bank:

Ru des Vaux de Cernay
Rouillon de Valence
Ru d'Écosse-Bouton
Ruisseau de Montabé
Vaularon
Ruisseau de Paradis
Rouillon

See also
 Vallée de Chevreuse

References

Rivers of France
Rivers of Yvelines
Rivers of Essonne
Rivers of Île-de-France